Gainor is a surname. Notable people with the surname include:

Charlie Gainor (1916–1996), American football player
Chris Gainor (born 1954), Canadian historian of technology
Dutch Gainor (1904–1962), Canadian ice hockey player
Martin Gainor (1915–1959), Canadian football player